William Brass, 1st Baron Chattisham (11 February 1886 – 24 August 1945), known as Sir William Brass between 1929 and 1945, was a British Conservative Party politician.

Early life
Brass was a sportsman and a soldier before entering politics, and served with the Royal Flying Corps and Royal Air Force in the First World War.

Political career
He was elected to the House of Commons as the Member of Parliament (MP) for Clitheroe in 1922, a seat he retained until 1945, and held posts at the Ministry of Transport and Ministry of Aircraft Production in 1941. He was also Chairman of the British Film Institute from 1939 to 1945. Brass was knighted in 1929 and in 1945 he was raised to the peerage as Baron Chattisham, of Clitheroe in the County Palatine of Lancaster.

Personal life
Lord Chattisham died at 20 Devonshire Place, Marylebone, on 24 August 1945, aged 59. Although cremated at Golders Green his ashes were interred at West Norwood Cemetery. He never married and the barony became extinct on his death.

Notes

References

External links 

1886 births
1945 deaths
Conservative Party (UK) MPs for English constituencies
UK MPs 1922–1923
UK MPs 1923–1924
UK MPs 1924–1929
UK MPs 1929–1931
UK MPs 1931–1935
UK MPs 1935–1945
UK MPs who were granted peerages
Chattisham, William Brass, 1st Baron
Chattisham, William Brass, 1st Baron
Chattisham, William Brass, 1st Baron
Chattisham, William Brass, 1st Baron
Barons created by George VI